Richard William Roth (born September 26, 1947) is an American former competition swimmer, Olympic champion, and former world record-holder in two events.  He swam in the 1964 Olympic Games in Tokyo, Japan, where he won the gold medal for his first-place finish in the men's 400-meter individual medley, setting a new world record of 4:45.4 in the event final.  Shortly before the individual medley final, Roth suffered an appendicitis, but refused an immediate operation.  He insisted the surgeons delay to allow him to swim in the final, and won the gold medal as a result.

Roth attended Stanford University.  He was a two-time individual NCAA champion for the Stanford Cardinal swimming and diving team, winning the 200- and 400-yard individual medley.

See also
 List of members of the International Swimming Hall of Fame
 List of Olympic medalists in swimming (men)
 List of Stanford University people
 World record progression 200 metres individual medley
 World record progression 400 metres individual medley

References

External links
 
 

1947 births
Living people
American male medley swimmers
World record setters in swimming
Olympic gold medalists for the United States in swimming
Sportspeople from Palo Alto, California
Stanford Cardinal men's swimmers
Swimmers at the 1964 Summer Olympics
Medalists at the 1964 Summer Olympics
Universiade medalists in swimming
Universiade gold medalists for the United States
Medalists at the 1965 Summer Universiade
20th-century American people